Myint Swe is a Burmese name and mainly refers to:

Myint Swe (born 1951) Acting President (2018, 2021–present), Vice President of Myanmar (2016–present)

Myint Swe may also mean:
 Bo Myint Swe, member of the Thirty Comrades
 Myint Swe, pen name of Ba Swe, 2nd Prime Minister of Burma
 Myint Swe (writer), writer and physician
 Hla Myint Swe (artist), artist, photographer and author from Myanmar
 Myint Swe (born 1965), politician and military officer